Kannika Thipachot, Nickname is Lex.. She is a Thai indoor volleyball player. She plays as an outside hitter. She is a member of the Thailand women's national volleyball team in 2014.

Kannika Thipachot is The tournament's Best Scorer of Shakey's V-league 2013 in Philippines.

Graduation 
 Ayutthaya Technological Commercial College.
 Bachelor's degree from Sripatum University 
 Master's degree from Sripatum University

Clubs 
  Ayutthaya A.T.C.C (2008–2015)
  Cagayan Valley (2012-2013)
  Power Smashers (2017)
  Khonkaen Star (2015-2021)
  Nakhon Ratchasima Women's VC (2021)
  Supreme Volleyball Club (Current Club 2021)

Awards

Individuals
 2012–13 Thailand League "Best Scorer"
 2013 Shakey's V-league "Best Scorer"
 2015 Nonsi Games 42nd "MVP"
 2016 CH7 Championship 2016  "MVP"
 2017 Suranaree Games 44th "MVP"
 2018 CH7 Championship 2018  "Best Outside Hitter"

Clubs
 2009-10 Thailand League -  Champion, with Ayutthaya A.T.C.C
2010-11 Thailand League -  Silver, with Ayutthaya A.T.C.C
2013-14 Thailand League -  Bronze medal, with Ayutthaya A.T.C.C
 2013 Shakey's V-league -  Champions, with Cagayan Valley
 2013 Thai-Denmark Super League -  Bronze medal, with Ayutthaya A.T.C.C
 2014 Thai–Denmark Super League -  Champions, with Ayutthaya A.T.C.C
2015 Thai-Denmark Super League -  Bronze medal, with Ayutthaya A.T.C.C
 2019 Thai–Denmark Super League -  Bronze medal, with Khonkaen Star
 2021 Asian Women's Club Volleyball Championship -  Silver, with Nakhon Ratchasima Women's VC
2021 SAT Thailand Volleyball Invitation Sisaket 2021-  Champion, with Supreme Volleyball Club

University Club 
 2015 Nonsi Games 42nd -  Champion, with SPU Volleyball Club
 2015 CH7 Championship 2015 -  Silver, with SPU Volleyball Club
 2016 CH7 Championship 2016 -  Champion, with SPU Volleyball Club
 2017 Suranaree Games 44th -  Champion, with SPU Volleyball Club
 2017 CH7 Championship 2017 -  Silver, with SPU Volleyball Club
 2018 CH7 Championship 2018 -  Champion, with SPU Volleyball Club
 2019 UBRU Games 46th -   Silver, with SPU Volleyball Club

Other 
  2011 - "PEA" Women's Volleyball Championship 7th -  Champion
  2010 - Volleyball Asean School Games -   Champion
  2011 - Volleyball Asian School Corls -  Champion
  2012 - Volleyball Asean University -  Silver
  2014 - VTV International Women's Volleyball Cup -  Silver

References

External links
 FIVB profile

1993 births
Living people
Kannika Thipachot
Kannika Thipachot
Competitors at the 2021 Southeast Asian Games
Outside hitters
Kannika Thipachot